Saleh Al-Sharrah (born 1 February 1973) is a Kuwaiti judoka. He competed in the men's lightweight event at the 1996 Summer Olympics.

References

1973 births
Living people
Kuwaiti male judoka
Olympic judoka of Kuwait
Judoka at the 1996 Summer Olympics
Place of birth missing (living people)